Bowlegs is a town in Seminole County, Oklahoma, United States. The population was 405 at the 2010 census.

Etymology
According to tradition, the community has the name of Billy Bowlegs, a leader of the Seminoles in Florida. Bowlegs has frequently been noted on lists of unusual place names.

Geography
Bowlegs is located at  (35.147566, -96.669603).

Demographics

As of the census of 2000, there were 371 people, 148 households, and 108 families residing in the town. The racial makeup of the town was 81.13% White, 0.54% African American, 15.63% Native American, 0.27% from other races, and 2.43% from two or more races. Hispanic or Latino of any race were 1.35% of the population.

There were 148 households, out of which 25.7% had children under the age of 18 living with them, 56.1% were married couples living together, 10.1% had a female householder with no husband present, and 27.0% were non-families. 23.0% of all households were made up of individuals, and 8.8% had someone living alone who was 65 years of age or older. The average household size was 2.51 and the average family size was 2.97.

In the town, the population was spread out, with 25.6% under the age of 18, 6.5% from 18 to 24, 23.5% from 25 to 44, 29.9% from 45 to 64, and 14.6% who were 65 years of age or older. The median age was 40 years. For every 100 females, there were 86.4 males. For every 100 females age 18 and over, there were 90.3 males.

The median income for a household in the town was $26,250, and the median income for a family was $28,333. Males had a median income of $22,125 versus $16,354 for females. The per capita income for the town was $12,459. About 15.5% of families and 24.0% of the population were below the poverty line, including 27.5% of those under age 18 and 36.0% of those age 65 or over.

References

"Bowlegs, Oklahoma was, during the 1900s & 1920s, the largest "Oil Town" in Oklahoma. Seminole, Oklahoma was 2nd only to Bowlegs in oilfield activity. See: "Special Collections Library" at the "University of Tulsa". (Cultural Anthropologist - Rosemary Jackson,2022.)

External links
 Encyclopedia of Oklahoma History and Culture - Bowlegs

Towns in Seminole County, Oklahoma
Towns in Oklahoma